Vasaj (also known as Vasanj, Vashāch, and Wasāch) is a village in Khezel-e Sharqi Rural District, Khezel District, Nahavand County, Hamadan Province, Iran. At the 2006 census, its population was 820, in 170 families.

See also

References 

Populated places in Nahavand County